Fern pine may refer to:
Afrocarpus falcatus, the African fern pine, a podocarp tree native to southern Africa
Podocarpus macrophyllus, a podocarp tree native to China